Christer Gunnar Holm (born 21 September 1940) is a former tennis player from Sweden.

Career
Holm represented Sweden in the Davis Cup competition during 1966 Europe Zone first-round tie against Poland. He played both singles rubbers, losing to Piotr Jamroz in the first rubber and beating Wieslaw Gasiorek in the last.

In Grand Slam tennis, Holm qualified for the 1960 Wimbledon Championships losing in the first round. At the 1965 Australian Open he reached the third round before losing to Tony Roche.

Holm is the father of former ATP professional players, Henrik Holm and Nils Holm.

See also
List of Sweden Davis Cup team representatives

References

External links
 
 

1940 births
Living people
Swedish male tennis players
20th-century Swedish people